Giuseppe Camino (1818-1890) was an Italian painter, mainly of landscapes and vedute.

Biography
A young man he painted an altarpiece for church of Rocciamelone depicting St Vincent of Paoli and a Via Crucis for the Convent of the Visitation in Turin. He trained under Giuseppe Bogliani and Angelo Beccaria. He worked on scenography for the Teatro Regio of Turin. He painted landscapes of the Roman Campagna (circa 1845), vedute of Paris and London (1851), and many alpine landscapes of this native Piedmont. Many of his works are exhibited at the Ducal Castle of Agliè.

References

External links

ArtNet: More works by Camino

1818 births
1890 deaths
Painters from Turin
Italian landscape painters
Italian scenic designers
19th-century Italian painters
Italian male painters
19th-century Italian male artists